Swiftarc Ventures is an American-based early and growth stage venture capital fund headquartered in New York City. 

Swiftarc also has offices in Miami, FL.

History 
The Swiftarc Ventures is founded in 2019 by Sid Jawahar, Frank Krasovec and Zohar Ziv.

It is led by managing partner - Sid Jawahar and three general partners - Frank Krasovec, Zohar Ziv and Andrew Barth. The investment team consists of over a dozen investment professionals around the world.

Investments 
Switarc invests on telehealth, beauty startups, and early-stage consumer tech and food sustainability companies.

Its major invests include Intellihealth, Thirteen Lune, Pause Well-Aging, Alleyoop, R-Zero, Artiphon.

The firm has three separate invest funds - Swiftarc Venture Labs Fund, Swiftarc Telehealth Fund and Swiftarc Beauty Fund.

In August 2021, Swiftarc Ventures announced $10 million Swiftarc Beauty Fund to support female founders in beauty and wellness sectors.

References

External links 
 Homepage
 

Financial services companies based in New York City
Financial services companies established in 2019
Venture capital firms of the United States